Iman Asante Shumpert (born June 26, 1990) is a former American professional basketball player. Shumpert was selected by the New York Knicks with the 17th overall pick in the 2011 NBA draft. He won an NBA championship with the Cleveland Cavaliers in 2016.

In 2021, Shumpert won Season 30 of Dancing with the Stars with pro Daniella Karagach. This makes him the first NBA player to make the finale and win.

Early life
Shumpert was born in Berwyn, Illinois. In eighth grade, he and fellow NBA player Evan Turner were teammates on the same basketball team at Gwendolyn Brooks Middle School in Harvey, Illinois. He went on to attend Oak Park and River Forest High School where he was a first team all-state player and was one of the nation's top 30 seniors. He helped Oak Park and River Forest to three conference titles and was named conference MVP as a junior and senior. He was rated No. 15 among the nation's senior players by Scout.com and No. 26 by Rivals.com. He was also selected to play in the 2008 McDonald's All-American Game, and was named a third-team Parade All-American.

College career
As a freshman for Georgia Tech in 2008–09, Shumpert was the team's fourth-leading scorer for the season, averaging 10.5 points per game and hitting 34.5 percent of his three-point attempts. During the 2009–10 season, Shumpert underwent arthroscopic surgery to repair a damaged meniscus in his right knee on December 3, and missed six games. He went on to finish the season as the team's third-leading scorer with 10.0 points per game.

In the 2010–11 season, Shumpert led his team in scoring (17.3 ppg), rebounding and assists, becoming only the seventh player in ACC history to do so. He ranked fourth in the ACC in scoring, 15th in rebounds, 10th in field goal and free throw percentage, and first in steals (seventh in the nation). He was named to the All-ACC second team and was a member of the conference's all-defensive team. He also holds the Georgia Tech record for steals per game.

On March 28, 2011, Shumpert declared for the NBA draft, foregoing his final year of college eligibility.

NBA career

New York Knicks (2011–2015)

Shumpert was drafted with the 17th overall pick in the 2011 NBA draft by the New York Knicks. In February 2012, then teammate Jared Jeffries said that "he's about as good an on-ball defender as there is in the league right now". Shumpert was selected to compete in the 2012 NBA All-Star Weekend Slam Dunk Contest but was unable to participate due to a knee injury.

On April 28, 2012, during a first round playoff game against the Miami Heat, Shumpert suffered a knee injury while dribbling in midcourt and was immediately helped off the court. An MRI later revealed that Shumpert tore the ACL and meniscus in his left knee and would miss the rest of the season.

Shumpert finished 5th in the 2012 NBA Rookie of the Year voting. He received 33 total votes and one first-place vote from a ballot that was filled out by 120 writers and broadcasters from across the country. He was also the only rookie to receive votes for the Defensive Player of the Year award.

On January 13, 2013, Shumpert was medically cleared to participate in team practice. He made his season debut on January 17 in a game against the Detroit Pistons at The O2 Arena in London. He went on to record 8 points, 3 rebounds, one assist, one steal and one block.

In July 2013, Shumpert played one summer league game for the Knicks, recording 2 points, 6 rebounds and 4 assists in a 72-77 loss to the New Orleans Pelicans.

On December 12, 2014, Shumpert dislocated his left shoulder in the second quarter of the Knicks' 101-95 win over the Boston Celtics and was subsequently ruled out for three weeks.

Cleveland Cavaliers (2015–2018)
On January 5, 2015, Shumpert was traded to the Cleveland Cavaliers from the Knicks in a three-team trade that also involved the Oklahoma City Thunder. Cleveland received Shumpert and J. R. Smith from the Knicks and a first round pick in the 2015 NBA draft from the Thunder, while Cleveland sent Dion Waiters to Oklahoma City and Lou Amundson, Alex Kirk, and a second round pick in the 2019 NBA draft to the Knicks, and the Thunder sent Lance Thomas to the Knicks. On January 23, he made his debut for the Cavaliers, recording 8 points, 2 rebounds and 2 assists in the 129-90 win over the Charlotte Hornets. The Cavaliers made it to the 2015 NBA Finals, but they lost to the Golden State Warriors in six games.

On July 9, 2015, Shumpert re-signed with the Cavaliers to a four-year, $40 million contract. On September 29, 2015, he was ruled out for three months after suffering a ruptured Extensor Carpi Ulnaris sheath in his right wrist. He made his season debut on December 11 against the Orlando Magic, scoring 14 points off the bench in a 111–76 win. On March 5, 2016, he recorded 12 points and a career-high 16 rebounds off the bench in a 120–103 win over the Boston Celtics. On April 11, he was ruled out for the Cavaliers' final two games of the regular season after getting his left knee drained. Shumpert returned in time for the playoffs and helped the Cavaliers make it to the NBA Finals for the second straight season. The Cavaliers would again face the Golden State Warriors. Despite the Cavaliers going down 3–1 in the series following a Game 4 loss, they went on to win the series in seven games to become the first team in NBA history to win the championship after being down 3–1.

Cavaliers' coach Tyronn Lue started using Shumpert at backup point guard early on in the 2016–17 season. On March 14, 2017, he scored a season-high 18 points in a 128–96 win over the Detroit Pistons. Shumpert helped the Cavaliers go 12–1 over the first three rounds of the playoffs to reach the NBA Finals for a third straight season. There the Cavaliers matched-up with the Golden State Warriors, but lost the series in five games.

On December 1, 2017, Shumpert was ruled out for six to eight weeks following surgery on his left knee. He returned to action on January 23, 2018 against the San Antonio Spurs.

Sacramento Kings (2018–2019)
On February 8, 2018, Shumpert was acquired by the Sacramento Kings from the Cavaliers in a three-team trade that also involved the Utah Jazz. Despite not playing for the Kings in 2017–18, he opted in for the final year of his contract on June 8, 2018. He made his debut for the Kings on October 17, 2018, recording five points and three rebounds in 18 minutes off the bench in a 123–117 season-opening loss to the Utah Jazz. Four days later, Shumpert scored 16 of his 26 points in the first quarter of the Kings' 131–120 win over the Oklahoma City Thunder. On November 19, he scored 21 of his 23 points in the first half of the Kings' 117–113 win over the Thunder. On December 27, he scored 18 points and matched his career high with six 3-pointers in a 117–116 win over the Los Angeles Lakers.

Houston Rockets (2019)
On February 7, 2019, Shumpert was acquired by the Houston Rockets in a three-team trade. The Rockets sent a 2020 second round pick to the Kings, as well as Brandon Knight, Marquese Chriss, and a 2019 first round pick to the Cleveland Cavaliers.

Brooklyn Nets (2019; 2021)

On November 13, 2019, Shumpert signed with the Brooklyn Nets, who had a roster exemption created by the 25-game performance-enhancing substance (PED) suspension to Wilson Chandler. On December 12, when Chandler's suspension expired, Shumpert was waived by the Nets.

On January 30, 2021, Shumpert signed a deal to return to Brooklyn. He was waived on February 23 and then re-signed to a 10-day contract on February 26. He parted ways with the Nets upon expiration of the 10-day contract. He played two games for the Nets in that time.

Personal life
Shumpert's father, Odis, is an insurance broker while his mother, L'Tanya, is an adjunct professor of art and design at Columbia College in Chicago, Illinois. During the 2012–13 NBA season, Shumpert's high-top fade haircut attracted publicity. He shaved the fade in October 2013.

Shumpert and his wife, Teyana Taylor, have two daughters.

Outside basketball, Shumpert has dabbled in rap music. In 2012, he released the song "Knicks Anthem" and the mixtape Th3 #Post90s. In 2013, he released the song "Dear Kendrick" in response to Kendrick Lamar's verse in the song "Control" by Big Sean. The music video for his single "Chiraq" garnered media attention over the eccentric visuals.

Shumpert won the 30th season of Dancing with the Stars with professional partner Daniella Karagach. In week 6 of the 10 week elimination competition, the couple tied for the highest score with 4 10's in the contemporary dance. The dance, choreographed by Karagach, went viral online and was regarded by fans as one of the best dances in the show's history. Shumpert is the only NBA player in Dancing with the Stars history to qualify for the finals and to win the competition.

On July 31, 2022, Shumpert was arrested at Dallas Fort Worth International Airport for allegedly trying to bring six ounces of cannabis through security.

Career statistics

NBA

Regular season

|-
| style="text-align:left;"|
| style="text-align:left;"|New York
| 59 || 35 || 28.9 || .401 || .306 || .798 || 3.2 || 2.8 || 1.7 || .1 || 9.5
|-
| style="text-align:left;"|
| style="text-align:left;"|New York
| 45 || 45 || 22.1 || .396 || .402 || .766 || 3.0 || 1.7 || 1.0 || .2 || 6.8
|-
| style="text-align:left;"|
| style="text-align:left;"|New York
| 74 || 58 || 26.5 || .378 || .333 || .746 || 4.2 || 1.7 || 1.2 || .2 || 6.7
|-
| style="text-align:left;"|
| style="text-align:left;"|New York
| 24 || 24 || 26.0 || .409 || .348 || .676 || 3.4 || 3.3 || 1.3 || .1 || 9.3
|-
| style="text-align:left;"|
| style="text-align:left;"|Cleveland
| 38 || 1 || 24.2 || .410 || .338 || .667 || 3.8 || 1.5 || 1.3 || .3 || 7.2
|-
| style="text-align:left; background:#afe6ba;"|†
| style="text-align:left;"|Cleveland
| 54 || 5 || 24.4 || .374|| .295 || .784 || 3.8 || 1.7 || 1.0 || .4 || 5.8
|-
| style="text-align:left;"|
| style="text-align:left;"|Cleveland
| 76 || 31 || 25.5 || .411 || .360 || .789 || 2.9 || 1.4 || .8 || .4 || 7.5
|-
| style="text-align:left;"|
| style="text-align:left;"|Cleveland
| 14 || 6 || 19.7 || .379 || .269 || .733 || 2.9 || 1.2 || .6 || .4 || 4.4
|-
| style="text-align:left;"|
| style="text-align:left;"|Sacramento
| 42 || 40 || 26.2 || .382 || .366 || .829 || 3.1 || 2.2 || 1.1 || .5 || 8.9
|-
| style="text-align:left;"|
| style="text-align:left;"|Houston
| 20 || 1 || 19.1 || .347 || .296 || .500 || 2.7 || 1.1 || .6 || .2 || 4.6
|-
| style="text-align:left;"|
| style="text-align:left;"|Brooklyn
| 13 || 0 || 18.5 || .328 || .242 || .571 || 2.6 || .9 || .9 || .2 || 4.2
|-
| style="text-align:left;"|
| style="text-align:left;"|Brooklyn
| 2 || 0 || 5.5 || .250 || .000 ||  || .5 || .0 || .5 || .0 || 1.0
|- class="sortbottom"
| style="text-align:center;" colspan="2"|Career
| 461 || 246 || 24.9 || .391 || .337 || .764 || 3.3 || 1.8 || 1.1 || .3 || 7.2

Playoffs

|-
| style="text-align:left;"|2012
| style="text-align:left;"|New York
| 1 || 1 || 19.0 || .000 || .000 || .000 || 1.0 || .0 || 1.0 || .0 || .0
|-
| style="text-align:left;"|2013
| style="text-align:left;"|New York
| 12 || 12 || 28.1 || .410 || .429 || .857 || 6.0 || 1.3 || 1.1 || .3 || 9.3
|-
| style="text-align:left;"|2015
| style="text-align:left;"|Cleveland
| 20 || 16 || 34.8 || .360 || .355 || .750 || 4.9 || 1.2 || 1.3 || .8 || 9.1
|-
| style="text-align:left; background:#afe6ba;"|2016†
| style="text-align:left;"|Cleveland
| 21 || 0 || 17.3 || .462 || .382 || .636 || 2.2 || .8 || .5 || .1 || 3.3
|-
| style="text-align:left;"|2017
| style="text-align:left;"|Cleveland
| 17 || 0 || 16.2 || .417 || .385 || .824 || 2.8 || .9 || .6 || .2 || 4.4
|-
| style="text-align:left;"|2019
| style="text-align:left;"|Houston
| 8 || 0 || 13.6 || .385 || .364 || .250|| 1.5 || .3 || .1 || .0 || 3.6
|- class="sortbottom"
| style="text-align:center;" colspan="2"|Career
| 79 || 29 || 22.8 || .388 || .376 || .744 || 3.5 || .9 || .8 || .3 || 5.9

College

|-
| style="text-align:left;"|2008–09
| style="text-align:left;"|Georgia Tech
| 31 || 31 || 31.6 || .391 || .314 || .656 || 3.9 || 5.0 || 2.1 || 0.2 || 10.6
|-
| style="text-align:left;"|2009–10
| style="text-align:left;"|Georgia Tech
| 30 || 29 || 30.1 || .385 || .333 || .720 || 3.6 || 4.0 || 1.9 || 0.2 || 10.0
|-
| style="text-align:left;"|2010–11
| style="text-align:left;"|Georgia Tech
| 31 || 31 || 32.0 || .406 || .278 || .806 || 5.9 || 3.5 || 2.7 || 0.2 || 17.3
|- class="sortbottom"
| style="text-align:center;" colspan="2"|Career
| 92 || 91 || 31.3 || .396 || .305 || .738 || 4.5 || 4.2 || 2.3 || 0.2 || 12.7

Discography

EPs

References

External links

 Georgia Tech Yellow Jackets bio

1990 births
Living people
21st-century African-American musicians
21st-century American male musicians
21st-century American rappers
African-American basketball players
American male rappers
American men's basketball players
Basketball players from Illinois
Brooklyn Nets players
Cleveland Cavaliers players
Dancing with the Stars (American TV series) winners
Georgia Tech Yellow Jackets men's basketball players
Houston Rockets players
McDonald's High School All-Americans
New York Knicks draft picks
New York Knicks players
Parade High School All-Americans (boys' basketball)
Sacramento Kings players
Shooting guards
Sportspeople from Oak Park, Illinois